Born Yesterday is a 1993 American comedy film based on Born Yesterday, a play by Garson Kanin. It stars Melanie Griffith, John Goodman and Don Johnson. It was adapted by Douglas McGrath and directed by Luis Mandoki.

It is a remake of the 1950 film of the same name that starred Broderick Crawford, Judy Holliday (in an Oscar-winning performance) and William Holden.

Plot

A wealthy but crude businessman, Harry Brock, on a trip to the nation's capital, is socially embarrassed by his ditzy, uncultured showgirl girlfriend, Billie Dawn. He hires a reporter, Paul Verrall, to educate her ("teach her the ropes").

Harry comes to regret his idea when Billie not only becomes more savvy, questioning his unscrupulous deals and rebelling against his bullying, but also falls in love with Paul.

Cast
 Melanie Griffith as Billie Dawn
 John Goodman as Harry Brock
 Don Johnson as Paul Verrall
 Edward Herrmann as Ed Devery
 Max Perlich as JJ
 Michael Ensign as Phillipe
 Benjamin C. Bradlee as Alex Duffee, Sect. of the Navy
 Sally Quinn as Beatrice Duffee
 Fred Thompson as Sen. Hedges
 Celeste Yarnall as Mrs. Hedges
 Rondi Reed as Victoria Penny
 Kate McGregor-Stewart as Mrs. Hulse

Reception
Reviews to Born Yesterday were mostly negative, as it holds a 25% approval rating on Rotten Tomatoes based on 28 reviews, with an average rating of 4.1/10. The site's critics consensus reads: "Not even Melanie Griffith's charisma can inject fresh energy into this ill-conceived remake, which awkwardly retreads through the classic original's story without any of its charm." Audiences surveyed by CinemaScore gave the film a grade of "B+" on scale of A+ to F.

Melanie Griffith was nominated for the 1993 Golden Raspberry Award for Worst Actress for her performance in the film, where she lost to Madonna for her work in Body of Evidence.

References

External links

 
 
 
 
 
 

1993 films
1990s romantic comedy-drama films
American romantic comedy-drama films
Remakes of American films
Films scored by George Fenton
American films based on plays
Films directed by Luis Mandoki
Films set in Washington, D.C.
Hollywood Pictures films
Films with screenplays by Douglas McGrath
1990s English-language films
1990s American films

ja:ボーン・イエスタデイ#リメイク